Krisztofer Mészáros (born 5 September 2001) is a Hungarian artistic gymnast.

Career 
Mészáros won a bronze in the senior team event at the 2020 European Men's Artistic Gymnastics Championships.

At the  2022 European Championships Mészáros became the silver medalist on floor, becoming the first Hungarian male gymnast to do so.

Competitive history

References

Living people
2001 births
Hungarian male artistic gymnasts
Sportspeople from Győr
21st-century Hungarian people